Eivind Osnes (born 11 May 1938) is a Norwegian physicist.

He took his dr.philos. degree at the University of Oslo in 1966. His specialty became theoretical nuclear physics. He became docent at the University of Oslo in 1977 and professor in 1985. He is a member of the Norwegian Academy of Science and Letters. In 2009 he received the King's Medal of Merit in gold.

Osnes chaired the Norwegian Board of Technology from 1999 to 2007.

References

1938 births
Living people
Norwegian nuclear physicists
University of Oslo alumni
Academic staff of the University of Oslo
Members of the Norwegian Academy of Science and Letters